Dahaneh Sar Asiyab (also Romanized as Dahaneh Sar Asīyāb) is a village in Howmeh Rural District, in the Central District of Bam County, Kerman Province, Iran. At the 2006 census, its population was 72, in 20 families.

References 

Populated places in Bam County